Anthony Hawkins  (30 September 1932 – 23 September 2013), was an English-born, Australian-based television actor. He was best known for his roles as Detective Senior Sergeant Greg Smith in the police procedural Special Squad (1984) and Frank diAngelo on The Saddle Club. He also had a recurring role in Prisoner as Bob Morris from 1980 to 1982.

He trained as an actor at Guildhall School of Music and Drama following a brief stint working as a policeman in England.

Stage 
He was part of the cast in the first public performance of Kenneth G. Ross's important Australian play Breaker Morant, presented by the Melbourne Theatre Company at the Athenaeum Theatre, in Melbourne, Victoria, Australia, on Thursday, 2 February 1978.

He also appeared in the play The Happy Apple, staged at St Martins Theatre in Melbourne in the early 1970s. He toured the United States with Alfie, played in Birds on the Wing in Melbourne, and Bandwagon in Hobart.

Television

Early TV work was in the United Kingdom and included an appearance as a police constable in the television series No Hiding Place in 1959. He also acted in the Scotland Yard film series of shorts. His TV work in Australia included Ryan and Perryman on Parade, and frequent appearances on police dramas including Matlock Police, Division 4, Homicide and Cop Shop. In 1978, he made his film debut in a minor role in Brian De Palma's The Fury. During the next two years, he starred in the television miniseries Against the Wind and The Last Outlaw and appeared in police series Bluey (1976) before appearing in the soap opera Prisoner. Introduced as Bob Morris, the father of inmate Tracey Morris (Sue Devine), he eventually became a recurring character after the on-screen marriage of Bob Morris to Meg Jackson (Elspeth Ballantyne). He stayed with the series on an irregular basis until 1982, when he was written out entirely. That same year he made a cameo appearance with a number of his fellow Prisoner co-stars in the film Kitty and the Bagman.

He made a guest appearance in Carson's Law, and appeared in the films Phar Lap and Strikebound before joining the cast of Special Squad as Greg Smith, a role he played from 1984 to 1985. Playing a supporting role as Allenby in the 1987 film The Lighthorsemen, during the late 1980s he also made appearances on The Flying Doctors, Inside Running and the 1989 television movie Darlings of the Gods which featured cameo appearances of several other former Prisoner co-stars.

During the early 1990s, he appeared on Kelly, Bony and The Damnation of Harvey McHugh as well as in police dramas Janus and Mercury. His late career included recurring roles in Ocean Girl, Tales of the South Seas and, on the popular Australian children's TV series The Saddle Club.

Death

Anthony Hawkins died from cancer on 23 September 2013, aged 80.

Notes

External links
 
 Obituary

1932 births
2013 deaths
Australian male film actors
Australian male soap opera actors
Australian male stage actors
Deaths from cancer in Victoria (Australia)
20th-century Australian male actors
21st-century Australian male actors
English emigrants to Australia